is a train station in Minoh, Osaka Prefecture, Japan.

Lines
Hankyu Railway
Minoo Line

Layout
This station has 2 side platforms serving a track each.

Adjacent stations

Railway stations in Osaka Prefecture
Railway stations in Japan opened in 1921